Danby may refer to:

Places 
 Danby, California
 Danby, Missouri
 Danby, New York, a town
 Danby (CDP), New York
 Danby, North Yorkshire
 Danby, Vermont, a New England town
 Danby (CDP), Vermont, village in the towns of Danby and Mount Tabor
 Danby Township, Michigan
 Danby Wiske, North Yorkshire village

Other uses 
 Danby (surname)
 3415 Danby, asteroid
 First Danby ministry, an administration in 17th century England
 Earl of Danby, a subsidiary title of the Duke of Leeds
 Thomas Osborne, 1st Duke of Leeds
 Julia Frankau, novelist under the name of Frank Danby
 Leeds Thomas Danby, college in West Yorkshire
 Danby railway station in North Yorkshire
 Danby (appliances)

See also